Lacolle may refer to:

Places 
 Lacolle, Quebec, a municipality in southern Quebec, Canada
Champlain–St. Bernard de Lacolle Border Crossing, connects Champlain, New York and St-Bernard-de-Lacolle, Quebec on the United States–Canada border
 LaColle Falls Hydroelectric Dam, a partially completed dam on the North Saskatchewan River, in Prince Albert, Saskatchewan, Canada
Lacolle Mills Blockhouse, a blockhouse located in Saint-Paul-de-l'Île-aux-Noix, Quebec
 Lacolle River, a tributary of the Richelieu River in Montérégie, Quebec, Canada
Saint-Bernard-de-Lacolle, a municipality in Les Jardins-de-Napierville Regional County Municipality, Quebec, Canada, located in the administrative area of Montérégie

Military events 
Battle of Lacolle Mills (1812), British victory during the War of 1812
Battle of Lacolle Mills (1814), British victory during the War of 1812
Battle of Lacolle (1838), Battle of the 1838 Lower Canada Rebellion

See also
Colle (disambiguation)